Yadav Prasad Pant (1928 - November 14, 2007) was a prominent Nepalese economist and politician. He served as Fifth Governor of Nepal Rastra Bank between  Throughout his career he held several high level positions including senior economist at the UN ESCAP in Bangkok, Thailand; Governor of the Nepal Rastra Bank (1968–1973); Ambassador to Japan (1975–1979); and Minister for Commerce, Supplies, Finance (1980–1983) and Water Resources (1986–1988). He died at the age of 82 in Bumrungrad Hospital in Thailand.

Panta has introduced the Nepalese economy to the world by his writings.

References

Nepalese economists
1928 births
2007 deaths
Finance ministers of Nepal
Governors of Nepal Rastra Bank
Government ministers of Nepal
Ambassadors of Nepal to Japan
20th-century Nepalese businesspeople